Nicco is an Italian surname. Notable people with the surname include:

, politician with Autonomy Liberty Participation Ecology
 Gianluca Nicco, Italian footballer

See also
 Nicco (disambiguation)

Surnames
Italian-language surnames